James Guess Nelson (July 26, 1919 – December 24, 1986) was an American football running back. He played one season in the AAFC for the Miami Seahawks. Nelson played college football at Alabama, where he was part of the 1941 National Championship team. Though selected by the Chicago Cardinals in the 1942 NFL Draft, he did not play professional football until 1946. Instead, he served at March Field during World War II.

References 

1919 births
1986 deaths
People from Live Oak, Florida
Players of American football from Florida
American football running backs
Alabama Crimson Tide football players
Miami Seahawks players